Saint-Prix is a French commune located in the Val-d'Oise department, in the Île-de-France region.

Its inhabitants are called Saint-Prissians.

The commune is located 15 km to the north of Paris, on the southern flank of the vast butte-témoin bearing the forest of Montmorency. It overlooks the Montmorency valley.

The Hellenist, epigrapher and archaeologist Bernard Haussoullier (1852–1926) died in Saint-Prix.

Population

See also 
Communes of the Val-d'Oise department

Sources

External links 
Official website 

Association of Mayors of the Val d'Oise 

Communes of Val-d'Oise